George Cull (3 March 1856 — 9 May 1898) was an English first-class cricketer.

Cull was born at Lymington in March 1856. A club cricketer for Ringwood Cricket Club, he made two appearances in first-class cricket for Hampshire in 1877, against the Marylebone Cricket Club at Lord's and Derbyshire at Southampton. He scored 14 runs in his two matches, with a highest score of 7. Although he was a wicket-keeper at club level, in his two matches for Hampshire, Hector Hyslop was preferred as wicket-keeper. Cull spent the final twenty years of his life working as a postman on the Isle of Wight, where he died at Sandown in May 1898.

References

External links

1856 births
1898 deaths
People from Lymington
English cricketers
Hampshire cricketers
Wicket-keepers
British postmen